List of motorcycles of the 1890s aka motorrad (DE) sometimes motor cycle or moto cycle

Motorcycle
Hildebrand & Wolfmüller
Geneva steam bicycle
Marks motorcycle (1896-1901)
Millet motorcycle
Pennington motor bicycle
Roper 1896 steamer bike (see also Roper steam velocipedes)
Werner Motors 1897 model(motor over front wheel)
Excelsior Motor Company (UK) 1896 Crystal Palace motorcycle with Minerva
Perks & Birch Motor-wheel (1899-1904)

Tricycle
Ariel tricycle (1898)
Benz Patent-Motorwagen (1885-1893)
Léon Bollée Voiturette
De Dion-Bouton tricycle (produced 1897 to 1904)
Long steam tricycle
Indian Tri-Car (1907)
Motrice Pia
Orient tricycle
Pennington Autocar (1896)
Clark gasoline tricycle (1897)

Quadricycle

See also

Horse and buggy
History of steam road vehicles
History of the motorcycle
List of motorcycles by type of engine
List of motorcycles of 1900 to 1909
List of motorcycles of the 1910s
List of motorcycles of the 1920s
List of motorcycles of the 1930s
List of motorized trikes
Roper steam velocipede
Safety bicycle
Scooter (motorcycle)
Steam tricycle
Timeline of motorized bicycle history
Steam car

References

External links
 Motorcycle.com Motorcycle History: Part 1 Milestones: the genesis of the motorcycle

Motorcycles introduced in the 1890s
Lists of motorcycles